The Arrows A8 was a Formula One car, designed by Dave Wass, which the Arrows team used to compete in the  and  Formula One seasons. Powered by the BMW M12 turbocharged engine, its best finish was when Thierry Boutsen drove it to second place at the 1985 San Marino Grand Prix.

Design and development
The A8 was designed by Dave Wass and utilised a carbon-composite tub behind which was mounted the BMW M12 turbocharged engine, the team continuing the use of this powerplant from the previous season. The engines were maintained by Swiss engine guru Heini Mader. A total of five A8 cars were built for 1985.

Racing history

1985 season
For , Arrows continued with the Belgian driver Thierry Boutsen while Gerhard Berger was contracted to drive the second entry. A podium finish was achieved by Boutsen at Imola where he placed third but was later moved to second when winner Alain Prost's McLaren was disqualified for being underweight. Boutsen himself was lucky to finish the race having run out of fuel within sight of the flag, though he had enough momentum to be able to coast over the line still in third place. This proved to be the A8's high point as it was never again driven to a podium finish. 

The A8 scored 14 points during the 1985 season, placing Arrows eighth in the Constructors' Championship.

1986 season
Arrows continued with the A8 for the  season, with Marc Surer and Christian Danner nominated as drivers. The team could only place tenth in the Constructors' Championship final standings due to Danner scoring a solitary point for sixth place at the 1986 Austrian Grand Prix. The team introduced a new car, the A9, midseason at the Austrian Grand Prix where it was driven by Boutsen. After qualifying 21st, Boutsen retired from the race with turbo failure. After a further two races at which it failed to finish, the A9 was shelved and the team persevered with the A8 for the remainder of the season.

While Heini Mader did a good job in maintaining the team's BMW engines, they lacked the power of the same engines powering the Brabham and later Benetton teams as those particular engines were continually maintained by BMW, giving them access to new parts, information and factory backed development that Mader did not have. This was shown in the results as the Arrows-BMWs rarely out-qualified or out-raced the Brabhams or Benettons.

Complete Formula One results
(key) (results in bold indicate pole position; results in italics indicate fastest lap)

Notes

References

A08